The 14th season of Law & Order premiered on September 24, 2003 and concluded on May 19, 2004 on NBC which remained unchanged. The season consists of 24 episodes. This is the final season to feature Jerry Orbach as Det. Lennie Briscoe. The character was transferred to the spin-off Law & Order: Trial by Jury. Orbach appeared in only two episodes of the show, dying of prostate cancer on December 28, 2004.
In May 2004, it was announced that Dennis Farina would be replacing Jerry Orbach (Detective Lennie Briscoe) as Detective Joe Fontana.[1] Having moved over to the third Law & Order spin-off, Law & Order: Trial by Jury, Orbach only filmed two episodes of the series before his death in December 2004.[2] Season 14 was released on DVD, September 14, 2004 & the slimline reissue set was released on February 25, 2014.

Cast
The cast of season 14 remained unchanged from season 13. Jerry Orbach, who played Lennie Briscoe, left the series at the end of the 14th season, and was replaced by Dennis Farina.  But he moved to the third spin-off, Law & Order: Trial by Jury before his death on December 28, 2004 at the age of 69. This season aired alongside season five of Law & Order: Special Victims Unit and season 3 of Law & Order: Criminal Intent.

Main cast
 Jerry Orbach as Senior Detective Lennie Briscoe
 Jesse L. Martin as Junior Detective Ed Green
 S. Epatha Merkerson as Lieutenant Anita Van Buren
 Sam Waterston as Executive Assistant District Attorney Jack McCoy
 Elisabeth Röhm as Assistant District Attorney Serena Southerlyn
 Fred Dalton Thompson as District Attorney Arthur Branch

Recurring cast
 Carolyn McCormick as Dr. Elizabeth Olivet
 J. K. Simmons as Dr. Emil Skoda

Departure of Jerry Orbach
Jerry Orbach, who played Lennie Briscoe, left the series at the end of the 14th season.  But he reprised his role with only 2 episodes of Law & Order: Trial by Jury before his death on December 28, 2004 at the age of 69.

Episodes

Notes

This is the final season to feature Jerry Orbach as Det. Lennie Briscoe. The character was transferred to the spin-off Law & Order: Trial by Jury. Orbach appeared in only two episodes of the show, dying of prostate cancer on December 28, 2004.
 The episode "Blaze" is based on The Station nightclub fire.
Season 14 was released on DVD, September 14, 2004 & the slimline reissue set was released on February 25, 2014.
This was the second time that the series had no cast changes for two successive seasons. The first time this happened was with the 8th season.

References

External links
Episode guide from NBC.com

14
2003 American television seasons
2004 American television seasons